A gunroom is the junior officers' mess on a naval vessel. It was occupied by the officers below the rank of lieutenant.   In the wooden sailing ships it was on the lower deck, and was originally the quarters of the gunner, but in its form as a mess, guns were not normally found in it. The senior officers' equivalent is the wardroom.

In large ships of war, the gunroom was a compartment originally occupied by the gunner and his mates, but now fitted up for the accommodation of the junior officers; in smaller vessels, that used as a mess-room by the lieutenants.

In an English country house, the gunroom is a secure walk-in vault in which sporting rifles, shotguns, ammunition and other shooting accessories are kept.   They are locked away partly for security, partly as some makes such as Holland & Holland or Purdey are highly valuable (costing as much as £60,000 for shotguns and £100,000 for rifles and with a 2- to 3-year waiting list from order to delivery).

See also
 Magazine (artillery)

References

External links
 The Gunroom of HMSSurprise.org

Ship compartments

sv:Gunrum